On April 21–24, 1968, a deadly tornado outbreak struck portions of the Midwestern United States, primarily along the Ohio River Valley. The worst tornado was an F5 that struck portions of Southeastern Ohio from Wheelersburg to Gallipolis, just north of the Ohio–Kentucky state line, killing seven people and injuring at least 93. Another long-tracked violent tornado killed six people, injured 364 others, and produced possible F5 damage as it tracked along the Ohio River. At least one other violent tornado caused an additional fatality and 33 injuries in Ohio. In the end, at least 26 tornadoes touched down, leaving 14 dead, including five in Kentucky and nine in Ohio.

Background

Impact

Outbreak statistics

Confirmed tornadoes

April 21 event

April 22 event

April 23 event

April 24 event

Falmouth–Berlin–Bladeston–Chatham–Dover, Kentucky/Ripley–Decatur–Otway, Ohio

EDT (19:45 UTC). The tornado passed just southeast of the business district, its parent supercell attended by grapefruit-sized hailstones. The tornado damaged 380 homes in Falmouth and 40% of the town itself. 280 homes in Falmouth were described as having been either destroyed or sustained major damage. Four fatalities and 350 injuries occurred in Pendleton County, Kentucky, primarily in and near Falmouth. Crossing into Bracken County, the tornado caused additional damage in or near the communities of Berlin, Bladeston, and Chatham. Across Bracken County about 70 homes were destroyed or damaged and 175 barns were destroyed. One fatality was reported outside Augusta, and eight other people were injured in Bracken County. Entering Mason County, the tornado devastated Dover at 4:15 p.m. EDT (20:15 UTC), severely damaging 115 of 127 houses there. Six trailers and churches were destroyed and three businesses were damaged as well. Eyewitnesses in Dover reported two or three funnel clouds during the passage of the primary tornado. Two injuries occurred in Mason County. In Kentucky the tornado left 500 to 700 people homeless.

The tornado then crossed into Brown County, Ohio, south of Levanna and struck Ripley, where 30 homes were damaged, 40 barns were destroyed, and a tobacco warehouse and a shoe plant were badly damaged. Local reports suggested two separate tornado tracks in the area, one north of Ripley and another through town. Final reports of damage occurred near Otway and Lucasville in Scioto County. Four people were injured in Brown County. The tornado occasionally lifted as it dipped into valleys but mostly remained on the ground, though it may have been a tornado family. It produced high-end F4 damage and may have been an F5 like the Wheelersburg–Gallipolis event, but is officially rated F4. In all, the tornado injured 364 people and caused $27,775,250 in losses.

Wheelersburg–Lyra–Buckhorn–Cadmus–Centenary–Gallipolis, Ohio

At around 5:00 p.m. EDT (21:00 UTC), the deadliest tornado of the outbreak touched down. Although several eyewitnesses observed the tornado crossing the Ohio River en route to Wheelersburg, official records indicate that touchdown first occurred in Scioto County, Ohio; however, this segment may have been continuous with the F3 tornado that struck Greenup County, Kentucky. As the tornado impacted land, it struck a freight train stationed beside the river, toppling 10 empty coal-hoppers, one of which it lifted . The tornado then affected a combined trucking terminal and garage, a transfer company, a farm supplier, and seven homes at the foot of a hillside. One of the homes was swept from its foundation. Cars were tossed from US 52 as well. The tornado missed downtown Wheelersburg, but peripheral winds downed tree limbs in town, and a number of homes incurred damage as well. Outside Wheelersburg proper, the tornado intensified as it struck the Dogwood Ridge subdivision, causing F5 damage there. All known fatalities and 75 injuries occurred in this area. A greenhouse was destroyed and a furniture company had its roof torn off. A large metal power line truss tower was ripped off at the base and thrown by the tornado. Wheelersburg Cemetery was damaged as well.

Meteorological reports suggested that the tornado weakened after passing Dogwood Ridge and only traveled  in Ohio before dissipating. However, official records indicate that the storm moved east into Lawrence and Gallia counties and affected areas near and around the communities of Lyra, Buckhorn, Cadmus, Centenary, and Gallipolis, where the tornado dissipated  after its initial touchdown. One injury occurred in Lawrence County and 17 more in Gallia County. The tornado caused damage in the Gallipolis area before dissipating, where six house trailers, eight homes, and four farm buildings were destroyed. 15 buildings were damaged at the Gallipolis State Institute. In all, the tornado killed seven people, injured 93 others, and caused at least $2,750,030 in damage (1968 USD), approximately $2 million of which occurred in Scioto County alone. Approximately 69 homes and 28 other buildings were destroyed and another 476 structures were damaged. Then-Governor of Ohio Jim Rhodes called in the National Guard to assist the rescue and cleanup efforts. The F5 rating is disputed due to the fact that the homes that were swept away were not properly anchored to their foundations. Some National Weather Service records show that the tornado began with F3-level damage in Greenup County, Kentucky, making its track  in length. This was the first official F5 tornado in Ohio since tornado records began in 1950. Other F5 tornadoes in Ohio took place in Cincinnati and Xenia (near Dayton) on April 3, 1974, and in Niles near Youngstown and Warren on May 31, 1985.

Non-tornadic effects

Aftermath and recovery

See also
List of tornadoes and tornado outbreaks
List of North American tornadoes and tornado outbreaks

Notes

References

Sources

W
W
W
W
W
W
W
Wheelersburg, Ohio Tornado Outbreak, 1968
1968 in Ohio
1968 in Kentucky
April 1968 events in the United States